Sherpur Upazila is an upazila of Bogra District in the Division of Rajshahi, Bangladesh. Sherpur Thana was established in 1962 and was converted into an upazila in 1983. It is named after its administrative center, the town of Sherpur.
It is said that there once lived Sher (tiger) family in the vicinity, from which the name "Sherpur" evolved.

History of the War of Liberation
History of the War of Liberation On 25 April 1971 the Pak army abducted 32 innocent people and took them to the Itakhola mass killing site and shot 25 of them dead. On 26 April, they also killed more than three hundred innocent Bangalis at a place near the Ghoga Bridge. On the same day the Pak army brutally tortured to death 26 persons at village Darimukunda. Besides, in May the Pak army killed more than one hundred innocent people at village Kallani. Marks of the War of Liberation Mass killing site 1 (Baghra Colony).

Geography
It borders Shajahanpur Upazila to the north, Dhunat Upazila to the east, Sirajganj District to the south, Natore District to the south and west, and Nandigram Upazila to the west.

Demographics

According to the 2011 Bangladesh census, Sherpur Upazila had 81,753 households and a population of 332,825, 16.2% of whom lived in urban areas. 9.3% of the population was under the age of 5. The literacy rate (age 7 and over) was 62.1%, compared to the national average of 51.8%.

Tourism
Kherua Mosque, built in 1582, is an example of early Mughal architecture in Bengal. It is a symmetrical, single-aisled, three-bayed mosque with three domes. 
Bhabanipur Shaktipeeth, one of seven Shakti Peethas in Bangladesh, is a sacred site for the followers of Hinduism. Other famous spots are Bhabanipur Kali Mandir, 

Baghmara Jame Mosque, Baghmara jame mosque is located at Baghmara in Shah-bondegi
Baghmara Box Vandari Majar Shorif, 
Soudia Park City, 

Sirajnagar Mosque, 

Sher-Shah Mosque, 

Shah-Bandegi Mosque, 

Shah-Turkan Mosque, 

Gobinda Rai Mandir, 

Khasba Village,

Rural Development Academy.

Economy
Main sources of income Agriculture 61.33%, non-agricultural labourer 2.97%, industry 1.44%, commerce 14.50%, transport and communication 4.47%, service 5.79%, construction 1.88%, religious service 0.16%, rent and remittance 0.27% and others 7.19%. Agricultural land Landowner 50.08%, landless 49.92%; agricultural landowner: urban 31.78% and rural 53.29%.'

Main crops Paddy, wheat, jute, maize, mustard, kalai, betel leaf, potato, onion, vegetables. Main fruits Banana.

Besides, There are Fishery 32, dairy 181, poultry 172, hatchery 1, Manufactories Rice mill 516, Saw mill 44, Flour mill 251, Oil mill 12, Ice factory 10, Cement factory 1, Cold storage 1, Goldsmith 72, Blacksmith 335, Potteries 66, Weaving 460, Embroidery 547, Bamboo and Wood work 675.

Every year they export lot of  Paddy, wheat, maize, betel leaf, banana, vegetables.

Administration
Administration Sherpur Thana was formed in 1962 and it was turned into an upazila in 1983. Sherpur Upazila is divided into Sherpur Municipality and 10 union parishads. The union parishads are:

Bhabanipur Union Parishad
Bishalpur Union Parishad
Garidaha Union Parishad
Khamarkandi Union Parishad
Khanpur Union Parishad
Kusumbi Union Parishad
Mirzapur Union Parishad
Shah-Bandegi Union Parishad
Shimabari Union Parishad
Sughat Union Parishad

The union parishads are subdivided into 220 mauzas and 322 villages.

In the 2009 upazila elections, Md Mujibur Rahman Majanu was elected Upazila Chairman, while MA Halim and Mosammat Ajmi Ara Parveenwere elected vice chairmen. The Upazila Nirbahi Officer (UNO), who administers the upazila for the central government, is AKM Sarwar Jahan.

Sherpur Municipality is subdivided into 9 wards and 19 mahallas.

Education

There are one government college, 8 non-government general college, 5 non-government technical college, 42 Secondary School, 3 Institute in the upazila. Among them 4 Fazil Madrasha and 38 Dakhil Madrasha Average literacy 36.3%; male 41.5%, female 31%.

Government College
Government Sherpur College

Non-Government General College
Jamur Islamia College
Joyla Juan Degree College
Polli Unnayan Academy Laboratory School & College
Rahima Nawsher Ali College
Sherwood In T (Pvt) School And College
The Summit Internationational School & College

Non-Government General Women's College
Sherpur Town Club Pub. Lib. Mahila College
Simabari Women's College

Non-Government Technical College
Imco Technical And Business Management College
Kallayani Technical And Business Management College
Shalfa Technical And Business Management College
Sherpur Technical And Business Management College 
Sherpur Universal Technical And Business Management College

Secondary school
Betkhair High School
Bhadra Secondary School
Bhawanipur High School
Birakoir Adarsha High School
Bhimzani High School
Bishal Pur High School
Biswa High School
Chhatiani High School
Chhonka Bl High School
Dharmokam High School
Dhankundi Shahnaj Siraj High School
Doyal Sara Secondary School
Fuljore High School
Guagachhi Joyla High School
Hapunia Mohabag High School
Hosnabad Adarsha High School
Jabal-E Rahmat Adarsha Junior High School
Jamur Islamia High School
Jhajor Pancha Shakti High School
Jorgachha High School
Kachuapara High School
Kalla High School
Kalshimati High School
Kalyani High School
Kanaikandor High School
Khanpur B L High School
Khararkandi Union High School
Mohipur Colony Junior School
Pachul High School
Panchdewali Polash Memorial High School
Sherpur D J High School
Sherpur Town Colony A.J. High School
Sherua Adarsha High School
Sutrapur Adarsha High School
Talta High School
Tantra High School
Uchrang Bande Ali High School
Yousuf Uddin High School

Secondary Women's School
Khanpur Kayer Khali Girls High School
Magurgari Hatgari Junior Girl's High School
Malihata Girls High School
Mojibur Rahaman Mojnu Girls High School
Sherpur Pilot Girls High School
Shimabari Setara Rabbani Girls High School

Primary school
Baghmara santiniketon Govt primary school
Kanaikandar Govt primary school
Khandokar Tola Govt primary school
Upjela Govt primary school
Rajbari mukundo Govt primary school
Mirjapur Govt primary school
Sherua Govt primary school
Bagra Govt primary school 
Uchrang Govt primary school

Fazil Madrasha
Altadighi Fazil B. A Madrasah
Jamur Islamia Senior Alim Madrasa
Sherpur Shahidia Alia Madrasha

Women's Fazil Madrasha
Ulipur Amiria Somotullah Mohila Fazil Degree Madrashah

Dakhil Madrasha
Aminpur Sahid Mizania Dakhil Madrasha
Amoin Dakhil Madrasha
Ayera Jameoul Ulum Dhakhail Mad Ra Sa
Bagra Colone Dakhil Madrasha
Begum Shahjahan Talukder Dakhil Madrasha
Belgachi Mustiduan Dakhil Madrasha
Betkhoir Ahia Ul Ulum Dakhil Madrasha
Bhabanipur Dhkhil Madrasha
Biroil Shahid Torkania Dakhil Madrasha
Chalk Sadi Kashiabala Dakhil Madrasha
Darihasra Dakhil Madrasha
Donkundi Aysha Mowla Box Dakhil Madrasha
Fulbari Hamidia Dakhil Madrasha
Fultala Dakhil Madrasah
Garidaha Dakhil Madrasha
Garoi Mohammadia Dakhil Madrasha
Ghordour N.P Dakhil Madrasha
Hapunia Dakhil Madrasa
Kanupur Dakhil Madrasha
Khaga Dolong V C C Dakhil Madrasha
Mamur Shahi Dakhil Madrasha
Mirjapur Dakhin Para Dakhil Madrasha
Mirzapur Dakhil Madrasha
Moddaya Bhag Islamia Dakhil Madrasha
Mohipur Kaderia Islamic Mission Dakhil Madrasha
Nakua Islamika Dakhil Madrasha
Nishindara Dhkhil Madrasa
Razar Dighi Dakhil Madrasha
Shahanagar Islamia Dakhil Madrasha
Shalfa S R Chowdhory Dakhil Madrasah
Shibpur Rashidia Dakhil Madrasha
Shuvogasa Dakhil Madrasha
Shalya Para D.N.M. Rahman Dakhil Madrasha

Dakhil Madrasha (Girls)
Kafura Community Girls Dakhil Madrasa
Kallani Baleka Dakhil Madrasha
Khamarkandi Balika Dakhil Madrasha
Khandokar Tola Monshipara Balika Dakhil Madrasha
Rameshwarpur Shamsul Ulum Balika Dakil Madrasha

Institute
Bigboss SOFT BD
Mohipur Agriculture Training Institute
Polly Institute Of Medical Technology
Sherwood Polytechnic Institute

Religion
Islam is the dominant religion of Sherpur Upazila. Indigenous community such as santal belongs to this upazila.

There are 461 mosque, 65 temple, and 1 church. Among them noted religious institutions are Kherua Mosque, Dhar Mokam Mosque, and Sher Mokam Mosque.

NGO
Operationally important NGOs are BRAC, Association for Social Advancement, TMSS, Swanirvar Bangladesh. In addition, there are some reputed NGOs who have been established and raised from Sherpur Upazila. They are:

Association of Islamic Micro-investment (AIM)
Rural Development Foundation (RDF)
Hamsayapur Development Sangstha (HDS)

Media
Aajker Sherpur
Panchanadir Teere 
Uttaranchal Barta
Shastha Banglar Mukh
Sharad Argha
Janatar Samgram.
 দৈনিক যখন সময়

See also
Upazilas of Bangladesh
Districts of Bangladesh
Divisions of Bangladesh

References

Upazilas of Bogra District